The Pujarimath Museum (also spelled Pujari Math) is a museum located in Bhaktapur, Nepal. The Matha was constructed in the 15th century and rebuilt in 1763.

See also 
 List of museums in Nepal

References 

Bhaktapur
Museums in Nepal
15th-century establishments in Nepal